Murielle Telio is an American actress. She is best known for portraying Misty Mountains in the crime comedy film The Nice Guys (2016).

Career 
Telio began her acting career by appearing in small roles in several American television series and films. She appeared in guest starring television roles, including Eastbound & Down, Agents of S.H.I.E.L.D. and Red Oaks. In 2013, Telio portrayed Vanity in web series The Bay and appeared in two films The Gauntlet and The Caterpillar's Kimono. In 2015, she landed a role as Mariah in teen comedy film The DUFF. The DUFF received generally positive reviews from critics and grossed $43.5 million at the box office. She played adult film star Misty Mountains in crime comedy film The Nice Guys (2016), which grossed $62 million on a $50 million budget.

She has written multiple screenplays. She portrayed Larena in short film Larena (2018), which she also produced, directed and wrote.

Filmography

Films

Television

References

External links

 

Living people
American film actresses
American television actresses
21st-century American women
1993 births